Jean-Pierre Crovetto (born 20 June 1942) is a Monegasque sailor. He competed in the Dragon event at the 1960 Summer Olympics.

References

External links
 

1942 births
Living people
Monegasque male sailors (sport)
Olympic sailors of Monaco
Sailors at the 1960 Summer Olympics – Dragon
Place of birth missing (living people)
Mediterranean Games bronze medalists for Monaco
Snipe class sailors
Mediterranean Games medalists in sailing